Abrahám is a village and municipality in Galanta District of the Trnava Region of south-west Slovakia.

History
In historical records the village was first mentioned in 1266.

Geography
It has a population of about 1075 people.

Genealogical resources

The records for genealogical research are available at the state archive "Statny Archiv in Bratislava, Slovakia"

 Roman Catholic church records (births/marriages/deaths): 1688-1895
 Lutheran church records (births/marriages/deaths): 1701-1896
 Census records 1869 of Abram are not available at the state archive.

See also
 List of municipalities and towns in Slovakia

References

External links

Official page
https://web.archive.org/web/20070513023228/http://www.statistics.sk/mosmis/eng/run.html
Surnames of living people in Abram

Villages and municipalities in Galanta District